Old Elm Spring Colony is a Hutterite colony and census-designated place (CDP) in Hutchinson County, South Dakota, United States. The population was 114 at the 2020 census. It was first listed as a CDP prior to the 2020 census.

It is on the northern edge of the county, bordered to the north by Hanson County. It is on high ground on the east side of the James River.

The Old Elmspring Hutterite Colony, Parkston, SD, off the James River (Dakotas) in Hutchinson County, South Dakota, is listed on the National Register of Historic Places.

The Old Elmspring Hutterite Colony near Parkston, South Dakota, was started in 1876. It was listed on the NRHP in 1982.

It included Good Samaritan Home.
Historic function: Domestic; Agriculture/subsistence
Historic subfunction: Single Dwelling; Agricultural Outbuildings
Criteria: event, architecture/engineering
Number of acres: 8
Number of contributing buildings: 6

Demographics

References

Census-designated places in Hutchinson County, South Dakota
Census-designated places in South Dakota
Hutterite communities in the United States
National Register of Historic Places in Hutchinson County, South Dakota
Buildings and structures completed in 1876